Ronny Van Sweevelt (3 August 1962 – 17 June 2020) was a Belgian cyclist. He competed in the individual road race event at the 1984 Summer Olympics.

In later life he became addicted to drugs. He was in the news in 2000 after a police chase in Antwerp, after a suspected drug possession. He was sentenced in 2001.

Van Sweevelt died in Hasselt on 17 June 2020, after being in a coma which was caused by choking during a meal.

Ronny was the younger brother of Valère Van Sweevelt, also a former Belgian racing cyclist who won Liège–Bastogne–Liège in 1968.

References

External links
 

1962 births
2020 deaths
Belgian male cyclists
Olympic cyclists of Belgium
Cyclists at the 1984 Summer Olympics
Sportspeople from Hasselt
Cyclists from Limburg (Belgium)